The 2013 Southland Conference women's basketball tournament, a part of the 2012–13 NCAA Division I women's basketball season, took place March 13–16, 2013 at the Merrell Center in Katy, Texas. The winner of the tournament, the Oral Roberts Golden Eagles, received the Southland Conference's automatic bid to the 2013 NCAA tournament.

Seeds & Regular Season Standings
Only the Top 8 teams advance to the Southland Conference tournament. If a team ineligible for the NCAA Tourney should finish in the top 8, their seed will fall to the next eligible team. This chart shows all the teams records and standings and explains why teams advanced to the conference tourney or finished in certain tiebreaking positions. 
Sources:

Bracket

See also
2013 Southland Conference men's basketball tournament
Southland Conference women's basketball tournament

References

Southland Conference women's basketball tournament
Southland Conference basketball